Armetrakhimovo (Ärmet-Räxim) is a rural locality (a village) in Petrovsky Selsoviet, Ishimbaysky District, Bashkortostan, Russia. The population was 315 in 2010. There are seven streets.

Geography 
Armetrakhimovo is located 41 km northeast of Ishimbay (the district's administrative centre) by road. Vasilyevka is the nearest rural locality.

References 

Rural localities in Ishimbaysky District